Rui Ludovino (born 3 January 1967) is a Portuguese judoka. He competed in the men's extra-lightweight event at the 1992 Summer Olympics.

References

1967 births
Living people
Portuguese male judoka
Olympic judoka of Portugal
Judoka at the 1992 Summer Olympics
Sportspeople from Lisbon
20th-century Portuguese people